John Lawrence Cremean (26 January 1907 – 11 August 1982) was an Australian politician. Born in Melbourne, he was educated at Catholic schools before becoming a clerk. He was secretary to federal Labor minister Arthur Calwell from 1942 to 1945, secretary of the Fire Brigades Employees Union 1945–48, and also sat on Richmond City Council.

In 1945, Cremean's brother, Bert Cremean, died after surgery, and Jack was elected as a Labor member of the Victorian Legislative Assembly for Clifton Hill in the resulting by-election. In 1949, he transferred to federal politics, winning the new seat of Hoddle in the Australian House of Representatives. In 1955, Cremean was one of seven MPs who left the ALP and formed the Australian Labor Party (Anti-Communist), the precursor to the Democratic Labor Party. Cremean's seat of Hoddle was abolished for the 1955 election, so he contested its successor, Scullin, as an Anti-Communist, but was defeated by the Labor candidate, Ted Peters, the member for Burke. Cremean died in 1982.

References

1907 births
1982 deaths
Members of the Australian House of Representatives for Hoddle
Members of the Australian House of Representatives
Members of the Victorian Legislative Assembly
Australian Labor Party members of the Parliament of Australia
Democratic Labour Party members of the Parliament of Australia
Australian Labor Party members of the Parliament of Victoria
20th-century Australian politicians
People from Richmond, Victoria
Politicians from Melbourne